Penshurst Place is a historic building near Penhurst, Kent,  south east of London, England. It is the ancestral home of the Sidney family, and was the birthplace of the great Elizabethan poet, courtier and soldier, Sir Philip Sidney. The original medieval house is one of the most complete surviving examples of 14th-century domestic architecture in England. Part of the house and its gardens are open for public viewing. Many TV shows and movies have been filmed at Penshurst.

History

Penshurst Place was built in 1341 for Sir John de Pulteney, a London merchant and four times Lord Mayor of London who wanted a country residence within easy distance of London. This was at the time when such properties ceased to be castles: they were more dwellings that could be defended in an emergency. When Henry IV's third son, John, Duke of Bedford, occupied Penshurst, the second hall, known as the Buckingham Building, was built: so called after the subsequent owners, the Dukes of Buckingham. Edward Stafford, 3rd Duke of Buckingham was executed in 1521 by Henry VIII following a lavish feast held at Penshurst Place hosted by the Duke in honour of Henry; it then stayed in the crown estate for the rest of Henry's reign, with documented evidence Henry used Penshurst Place as a hunting lodge and visiting with his courtier Brandon, the property being only a few miles from Hever Castle, childhood home of Henry's second wife Anne Boleyn. 

In 1550, Henry VIII's son, King Edward VI, granted the house and estate to Sir Ralph Fane, a supporter of Protector Somerset, but it was forfeited two years later after Sir Ralph was executed for treason.

Sidney family

Penshurst Place was enlarged after 1552 when King Edward VI granted the house to Sir William Sidney (1482–1554), who had been a courtier to the King's father, Henry VIII. Sir William's son Henry (1529–1586) married Lady Mary Dudley, whose family became implicated in the Lady Jane Grey affair, although Henry himself escaped any such implications. During his lifetime he added apartments and the "King's Tower" to Penshurst. He employed a joiner Evan Lucas to supply panelling and carve ornaments including leopard's heads for the hall and gallery. Henry Sidney also created what is now one of England's oldest private gardens, with records going back to 1346.

Philip Sidney (1554–1586), Henry's son, was born at Penshurst Place in 1554. Poet and courtier, he was buried in Old St Paul's Cathedral, in London, having died 25 days after a fatal wounding from a bullet in the thigh at the battle of Zutphen, but his tomb was destroyed in the Great Fire of London in 1666.

Philip's brother, Robert Sidney, inherited Penshurst. His time there resulted in more additions to the state rooms, including an impressive "Long Gallery". He had also inherited the Earldom of Leicester, and his descendants for the next seven generations continued to live at the mansion.

By the 19th century, the building was falling into disrepair, but a new occupant in 1818, Sir John Shelley-Sidney, and his son Philip began to restore it. The latter was created 1st Baron De L'Isle and Dudley in 1835. The 6th Baron, William Sidney (1909–1991), was one of only two men who held both the Victoria Cross and membership of the Order of the Garter; he was created 1st Viscount De L'Isle in 1956. To him and to his son, the 2nd Viscount, much of the modern restoration of Penshurst is due, in spite of the house having suffered neglect during World War I. Today, the house and gardens are open to the public.

Many members of the family are buried or commemorated in the Sidney Chapel at St John the Baptist, Penshurst.

Main features of the house

It is possible to see in the house the evidence of occupation over its 670-year history:
The State Rooms, filled with a collection acquired by generations of the Sidney family.
The West Solar, or State Dining Room, part of the medieval building, contains a collection of family portraits, furniture and porcelain.
The Queen Elizabeth Room, named after Queen Elizabeth I, with its display of early upholstered furniture.
The Tapestry Room
The Long Gallery, full of royal and family portraits
The Nether Gallery: with an array of arms and armour
Toy Museum – features toys from several generations of the Sidney family, includes dolls, doll houses, teddies, toy soldiers, mechanical toys and general play items
Queen Victoria's stool: in one of the smallest rooms of the house, there is a green stool on display. Queen Victoria sat on this stool when she was pronounced Empress of India in 1876.

Filming location

Penshurst has been used as a filming location, including: Anne of the Thousand Days; the 1971 BBC series Elizabeth R; the 1992 television series Covington Cross; The Other Boleyn Girl; The Princess Bride; the  BBC TV show Merlin; The Hollow Crown; and the BBC’s 2015 series Wolf Hall.

References

External links

Penshurst Place — official site
Penshurst Place Garden — information on garden history
Details of the Sidney family
Flickr photos called Penshurst Place
Discover the Garden of England – Visitor information on Penshurst Place & Gardens and surrounding area

Buildings and structures completed in 1340
Houses completed in the 14th century
Country houses in Kent
Historic house museums in Kent
Tourist attractions in Kent
Buildings and structures in Sevenoaks District
Grade I listed houses in Kent
Toy museums in England
Grade I listed parks and gardens in Kent
Penshurst